Ampai Sualuang (born 8 February 1973) is a paralympic athlete from Thailand competing mainly in category T54 sprint events.

Biography
Ampai has competed in four Paralympics winning two medals.  He competed in the 2000 Summer Paralympics and was part of the Thai 4 × 100 m relay team won a gold medal and won another silver medal as part of the 4 × 100 m relay team.

References

External links

Ampai Sualuang
Ampai Sualuang
Ampai Sualuang
Paralympic medalists in athletics (track and field)
Medalists at the 2000 Summer Paralympics
Athletes (track and field) at the 1996 Summer Paralympics
Athletes (track and field) at the 2000 Summer Paralympics
Athletes (track and field) at the 2004 Summer Paralympics
Athletes (track and field) at the 2008 Summer Paralympics
1973 births
Living people
Ampai Sualuang
Medalists at the 2010 Asian Para Games
World Para Athletics Championships winners
Ampai Sualuang